Farallon, later renamed Netopia, was a computer networking company headquartered in Berkeley, and subsequently Emeryville, California, that produced a wide variety of products including bridges, repeaters and switches, and in their later Netopia incarnation,  modems, routers, gateways, and Wi-Fi devices. The company also produced the NBBS (Netopia Broadband Server Software) and, as Farallon, Timbuktu remote administration software, as well as the MacRecorder, the first audio capture and manipulation products for the Macintosh (later sold to Macromedia). The company was founded in 1986 and changed its name to Netopia in 1998. Farallon originated several notable technologies, including:

 PhoneNet, an implementation of AppleTalk over plain ("Cat-3") telephone wiring or, more commonly, EIA-TIA 568A/B structured cabling systems. Many versions of the product were produced, but the original product was a commercialized version of a kit developed and produced by BMUG, the Berkeley Macintosh Users Group in 1986.

 The StarController, a line of LocalTalk and Ethernet bridges and switches released in 1988 which integrated directly with EIA-TIA 568A/B structured cabling systems.

 EtherWave, an ADB-powered three-port bridge in a dongle form-factor which looked something like a manta ray. The two external ports were 10BASE-T and the ADB pigtail spoke an overclocked 690kbps version of LocalTalk. This served both to allow devices without expansion busses (commonly early Macintosh computers and LaserWriter printers) to connect directly to Ethernet networks, and also to allow the daisy-chaining of multiple devices from a single Ethernet switch or bridge port. Later versions used Apple's "AAUI" version of the Attachment Unit Interface to achieve full 10mbps host connections.

 AirDock, an ADB-to-IrDA gateway which allowed devices with LocalTalk ports to communicate on IrDA infrared wireless networks.
Netopia acquired multiple companies in the home networking space including Cayman and DoBox, Inc. DoBox, Inc., founded by Nicole Toomey Davis, Bradley Davis and Matt Smith, was acquired in 2002  for its award-winning DoBox Family Firewall and Home Server Gateway.  

Netopia was acquired by Motorola in the first quarter of 2007.

ISPs known to use Netopia modems include:
 AT&T in the United States
 Sonic.net in the United States
 Covad in the United States
 eircom in Ireland
 Swisscom in Switzerland
 NextGenTel in Norway
 France Télécom, Cegetel RSS, B3G Telecom, Nerim, Easynet, Claranet, Magic Online in France

References

External links
 Homepage of Netopia
 Netopia financial news from Google Finance

1986 establishments in California
2007 disestablishments in California
American companies established in 1986
American companies disestablished in 2007
Companies based in Emeryville, California
Computer companies established in 1986
Computer companies disestablished in 2007
Defunct computer companies of the United States
Networking hardware companies
Telecommunications companies of the United States